Bąkowo may refer to the following places:
Bąkowo, Greater Poland Voivodeship (west-central Poland)
Bąkowo, Świecie County in Kuyavian-Pomeranian Voivodeship (north-central Poland)
Bąkowo, Bytów County in Pomeranian Voivodeship (north Poland)
Bąkowo, Gdańsk County in Pomeranian Voivodeship (north Poland)
Bąkowo, Lębork County in Pomeranian Voivodeship (north Poland)